Love L. Sechrest (born October 14, 1962) is Dean of the Faculty and Vice President for Academic Affairs at Columbia Theological Seminary and was previously an Associate Professor of the New Testament at Fuller Theological Seminary, Pasadena, California. Her research interests include race and justice in the New Testament, African American Christianity, and womanist biblical interpretation in the New Testament. She serves on the board of directors for Faith & Learning, International, a Christian mission and social entrepreneurship business incubator.

Biography
Sechrest gained her bachelor degrees in computer science and sociology at Duke University in 1984 and her master's degree in computer science at Villanova University in 1993.

Prior to changing her career as a biblical scholar, she worked as a chief information officer in the aerospace industry at General Electric. She received several awards from the aerospace industry including from the American Jewish Committee/Shalom Hartman Institute, the Kern Foundation, the Wabash Institute, Duke University, the Fund for Theological Education, the National Institutes of Science/Ford Foundation, the Lockheed Martin President's Award, and the GE Aerospace General Manager's Award.

She completed her Master of Divinity at Trinity Evangelical Divinity School in 1999 and her Ph.D. at Duke University in 2006. She has taught in both schools at the graduate level. She joined Fuller Theological Seminary in 2006 where she continued her teaching and scholarship on the New Testament. Since July 1, 2018, she has been the Dean of the Faculty and Vice President for Academic Affairs of Columbia Theological Seminary.

She has served as co-chair at the African American Biblical Hermeneutics section in the Society of Biblical Literature. She serves on the board of directors for Faith & Learning, International.

Works

Further reading 

 Race Relations in the Church in the Age of Obama

References 

1962 births
Living people
Villanova University alumni
Trinity Evangelical Divinity School alumni
Duke University alumni
Trinity International University faculty
Duke University faculty
Fuller Theological Seminary faculty
Columbia Theological Seminary faculty
New Testament scholars
African-American Methodists
African-American religious leaders
Womanist theologians
African-American biblical scholars
20th-century African-American women
20th-century African-American people
21st-century African-American women
Female biblical scholars